The Richmond Centre is a large shopping centre in Derry, Northern Ireland of . The centre hosts over 40 retail units, including some major high street names.
It was completed in 1984 within the city's historic walls. It was the first major regeneration project in the city, announced by Minister of State Richard Needham, since The Troubles began. It is close to the larger Foyleside shopping centre (400,000 sq ft, completed 1995), which is located approximately 50 metres away.

Stores
As of February 2022, stores in the development included Argento, Bonmarché, JD Sports, New Look, Poundworld, Shoe Zone, Starbucks, and The Works.

Rail Access
 Londonderry Waterside over the Peace Bridge.

External links
 Richmond Centre Website

References

Shopping centres in Northern Ireland
Buildings and structures in Derry (city)